The 2010–2011 Israeli Basketball Super League (Also known as Ligat Loto) was the 57th season of the top basketball league in Israel. The season began on 17 October 2010 and ended on 26 May 2011.

Format 

Each of the 10 participating teams play 18 regular league games, one home game and one away game against each other team. After that, there is 3rd round in which every team play against each other team once. The top eight teams advance to the playoff, where they play best-of-5 series decided by the rankings at the end of the regular season (first against eighth, second against seventh and so on). The series winners play in the Final Four to determine the championship.
The two 9th and 10th ranked teams compete in a best-of-5 series relegation playoff, and the loser will be relegated to Liga Leumit 2010–2011.

Team information

Stadia and locations

Head coaches

Regular season 

Pld – Played; W – Won; L – Lost; PF – Points for; PA – Points against; Diff – Difference; Pts – Points.

Rounds 1-2 

The home team is listed on the left-hand column.The rightmost column and the bottom row list the teams' home and away records respectively.
1The match between Maccabi Haifa and Maccabi Rishon LeZion was postponed because of the Mount Carmel forest fire. It was played on January 13.
2The match between Maccabi Haifa and Hapoel Holon was postponed at Maccabi Haifa's request. It was played on January 27.

Round 3

1st Week

2nd Week

3rd Week

4th Week

5th Week

6th Week

7th Week

8th Week

9th Week

Playoff 

The higher ranked team hosts games 1, 3 and 5 (if necessary). The lower ranked team hosts games 2 and 4 (if necessary).

Final four

Relegation Playoff 

The higher ranked team hosts games 1, 3 and 5 (if necessary). The lower ranked team hosts games 2 and 4 (if necessary).

Ironi Ashkelon was relegated to Liga Leumit.

2011 BSL All-Star Game 

On December 8, the BSL League Administration announced the re-establishment of the BSL All-Star Game, which played on January 12, 2011. The main event was the game between the Israeli All-Stars (coached by Effi Birnbaum and Oded Kattash) and the International All-Stars (coached by David Blatt and Dan Shamir). The players were chosen by online voting.

Stats Leaders 
As of March 21

Efficiency

Points

Rebounds

Assists

Game records

Awards

See also 
 Israeli Basketball State Cup 2010-11
 Israeli Basketball League Cup 2010

References

External links 
 IBA's official website (Hebrew)

Israeli Basketball Premier League seasons
Israeli
League